A trojan wave packet is a wave packet that is nonstationary and nonspreading. It is part of an artificially created system that consists of a nucleus and one or more electron wave packets, and that is highly excited under a continuous electromagnetic field.

The strong, polarized electromagnetic field, holds or "traps" each electron wave packet in an intentionally selected orbit (energy shell). They derive their names from the trojan asteroids in the Sun–Jupiter system. Trojan asteroids orbit around the Sun in Jupiter's orbit at its Lagrangian equilibrium points L4 and L5, where they are phase-locked and protected from collision with each other, and this phenomenon is analogous to the way the wave packet is held together.

Concepts and research
The concept of the Trojan wave packet is derived from a flourishing area of physics which manipulates atoms and ions at the atomic level creating ion traps. Ion traps allow the manipulation of atoms and are used to create new states of matter including ionic liquids, Wigner crystals and Bose–Einstein condensates.
This ability to manipulate the quantum properties directly is key to the development of applicable nanodevices such as quantum dots and microchip traps. In 2004 it was shown that it is   possible to create a trap which is actually a single atom.  Within the atom, the behavior of an electron can be manipulated.

During experiments in 2004 using lithium atoms in an excited state, researchers were able to localize an electron in a classical orbit for 15,000 orbits (900 ns). It was neither spreading nor dispersing. This "classical atom" was synthesized by "tethering" the electron using a microwave field to which its motion is phase locked. The phase lock of the electrons in this unique atomic system is, as mentioned above, analogous to the phase locked asteroids of Jupiter's orbit.

The techniques explored in this experiment are a solution to a problem that dates back to 1926. Physicists at that time realized that any initially localized wave packet will inevitably spread around the orbit of the electrons. Physicist noticed that "the wave equation is dispersive for the atomic Coulomb potential." In the 1980s several groups of researchers proved this to be true. The wave packets spread all the way around the orbits and coherently interfered with themselves. Recently the real world innovation realized with experiments such as Trojan wave packets, is localizing the wave packets, i.e., with no dispersion. Applying a  polarized circular EM field, at microwave frequencies, synchronized with an electron wave packet, intentionally keeps the electron wave packets in a Lagrange type orbit.
The Trojan wave packet  experiments built on previous work with lithium atoms in an excited state. These are atoms, which respond sensitively to electric and magnetic fields, have decay periods that are relatively prolonged, and electrons, which for all intents and purposes actually operate in classical orbits. The sensitivity to electric and magnetic fields is important because this allows control and response  by the polarized microwave field.

Beyond single electron wave packets

The next logical step is to attempt to move from single electron wave packets to more than one electron wave packet. This had already been accomplished in barium atoms, with two electron wave packets. These two were localized. However, eventually, these created dispersion after colliding near the nucleus. Another technique employed a nondispersive pair of electrons, but one of these had to have a localized orbit close to the nucleus. The nondispersive two-electron Trojan wave packets demonstration changes all that. These are the next step analogue of the one electron
Trojan wave packets – and designed for excited helium atoms.

As of July 2005, atoms with coherent, stable two-electron, nondispersing wave packets had been created. These are excited helium-like atoms, or  quantum dot helium (in solid-state applications), and are atomic (quantum) analogues to the three body problem of Newton's classical physics, which includes today's astrophysics. In tandem, circularly polarized electromagnetic and magnetic fields stabilize the two electron configuration in the helium atom or the quantum dot helium (with impurity center). The stability is maintained over a broad spectrum, and because of this, the configuration of two electron wave packets is considered to be truly nondispersive.  For example, with the quantum dot helium, configured for confining electrons in two spatial dimensions, there now exists a variety of trojan wave packet configurations with two electrons, and as of 2005, only one in three dimensions. In 2012 an  essential experimental step  was undertaken not only generating but locking the Trojan wavepackets on adiabatically changed frequency and expanding the atoms as once predicted by Kalinski and Eberly. It will allow 
to create two electron Langmuir Trojan wave packets in Helium by the sequential excitation in adiabatic Stark field
able to produce the circular one-electron aureola over  first and then put the second electron in similar state.

See also
Atomic orbital
Rydberg state
Soliton wave
Quantum scar

References

Further reading

Books

Journal articles

External links
 Aharonov-Bohm Oscillations In "Trojan Electrons"
 Experimental creation of "Trojan Wave Packets" - Barry Dunnings's talk on youtube
 Multi-electron extensions of "Trojan Wave Packets" - Matt Kalinski's talk (1) on youtube
 Multi-electron extensions of "Trojan Wave Packets" - Matt Kalinski's talk (2) on youtube
 Opposite phenomenon - Cycloatoms (PPT Presentation by Robert Wagner)- accelerated counterintuitive relativistic spreading of the sharp Gaussian wave packet originally resembling the ground state into the ring in the hydrogen atom in the ultra-strong magnetic and the laser fields (animation)

Materials science
Microelectronic and microelectromechanical systems
Microtechnology
Nanoelectronics
Nanotechnology
Quantum mechanics